Thomas Wells may refer to:

Politicians
 Thomas Leonard Wells (1930–2000), Ontario political figure
 Thomas Wells (MP), Member of Parliament (MP) for Downton
 Tommy Wells (born 1957), Washington, D.C. politician

Others
 Thomas B. Wells (born 1945), U.S. Tax Court judge
 Thomas Bucklin Wells, one-time actor and husband of Dorothy Dunbar
 Thomas M. Wells (1841–1901), Civil War Congressional Medal of Honor recipient
 Thomas Spencer Wells (1818–1897), surgeon to Queen Victoria
 Thomas Wells (composer) (born 1945), American composer
 Thomas Wells (died 1868), first person executed privately in Britain, hanged by William Calcraft
 Thomas Wells (cricketer) (1927–2001), New Zealand-born cricketer
 Tom Wells (cricketer) (born 1993), English cricketer
 Tommy Wells (footballer) (1911–1993), Australian rules footballer who played with Fitzroy
 Tom Wells (footballer) (1883–1959), Australian rules footballer who played with Fitzroy
 Thomas Wells (judge) (c. 1888–1954), judge of the Northern Territory Supreme Court
 Thomas Wells (Royal Navy officer) (1759–1811), British admiral
 Thomas Wells (Rhode Island judge) (1723–1795), Justice of the Rhode Island Supreme Court

See also
 Thomas Welles (disambiguation)
 Welles (name)
 Wells (name)